The Thakurai are a Muslim Rajput community found in the state of Bihar in India. They are mostly concentrated around [East and West Champaran District ] the surrounding region. A small number are also found in the Terai region of Nepal.

Origin 

The Thakurai are said to have originated in Rajasthan, and were converted to Islam during the rule of the Mughal Emperor Aurangzeb. They were soldiers in the Mughal army that was sent to pacify Bihar. Their ancestor was a Mahabat Khan, (Ashfaque Ahmad (mukhiya) from his family) who was a Sisodia Rajput of Mewar, who converted to Islam. They are now found in fifty three villages in Muzaffarpur, Vaishali, East and West Champaran District, and also have a presence in neighbouring Terai region of Nepal. The word Thakurai literally means lord, and originates from the Hindi term Thakur and in sainthawarmall sangh this caste are also found and Informed members of the community claim they use Thakurai to differentiate themselves from local Hindu Rajputs.

They speak Bhojpuri, Urdu and Hindi and are Sunni Muslims. The community perceives itself as being Rajput, and their customs are similar to other Muslim Rajputs of the Bihar region, such as the Khanzada of Bhojpur, but there is no intermarriage between the two groups.

Present circumstances 

The Thakurai are divided into a number of lineages, the main ones being Bakcha, Bharadwaj, Chauhan, Kuchbaria, Mahdwar, Raza, Hussain, Saif Ali, s/o Nasir  Ahmad, and Nafran. They are strictly endogamous, but do not practice clan exogamy. Marriages take place within the close kin group. The community are still largely farmers, and at one time were substantial landowners. They are now undergoing urbanization which is likely to affect group identity.

There are fairly influential in north Bihar, and historically dominated Muslim communal politics in this region. They are found mainly in and near the towns of Muzaffarpur, Vaishali, Raxaul, Ramgharwa, Sagauli, Adapur, and in villages of Nakerdehi, Khirlichiya and Amodei. Unlike, other Muslim communities, they maintain good relations with Hindu Rajputs who live in the same villages, likely due to a common heritage.

A small number of Thakurai are also found in the Parsa and Bara districts of Nepal.

Notable People

 Sabir Ali, Bihar Politician & Member of Rajya Sabha during 2008-14

References

Khanzada
Rajput clans
Muslim communities of India
Muslim communities of Nepal
Rajput clans of Bihar
Social groups of Bihar
Muslim communities of Bihar